Rozhkov, or Rozhkova (feminine; Рожкова) is a Russian last name and may refer to:

Andrey Rozhkov (b. 1944), a Russian diplomat
Igor Rozhkov (b. 1981), a Belarusian professional footballer.
Mikhail Rozhkov (b. 1983), a Kazakhstan football player
Nikolai Rozhkov (1868–1927), a Russian revolutionary active in the Russian Social Democratic Labour Party
Pavel Rozhkov (b. 1986), a Russian professional football player
Poļina Rožkova , a Latvian wheelchair curler
Sergei Rozhkov (b. 1972), a Russian biathlete
Sergei Rozhkov (footballer) (b. 1943), a retired Soviet football player and Russian coach

Russian-language surnames